The 1982 Lorraine Open was a men's tennis tournament played on indoor carpet courts. The event was part of the 1982 Volvo Grand Prix. It was played in Metz in France and was held from 15 March through 21 March 1982. It was the fourth edition of the tournament and unseeded Erick Iskersky won the singles title.

Finals

Singles
 Erick Iskersky defeated  Steve Denton 6–4, 6–3
 It was Iskersky's only singles title of his career.

Doubles
 David Carter /  Paul Kronk defeated  Matt Doyle /  David Siegler 6–3, 7–6

References

External links
 ITF tournament draw sheets

Lorraine Open
Lorraine Open
Lorraine Open
Lorraine Open